Vaishali Nagar Legislative Assembly constituency is one of the 90 Legislative Assembly constituencies of Chhattisgarh state in India.

It is part of Durg district.

Members of the Legislative Assembly

Election results

2018

See also
 List of constituencies of the Chhattisgarh Legislative Assembly
 Durg district

References

Durg district
Assembly constituencies of Chhattisgarh